Mycena interrupta, commonly known as the pixie's parasol, is a species of mushroom. It has a Gondwanan distribution pattern, being found in Australia, New Zealand, New Caledonia and Chile. In Australia, it is found in Victoria, Tasmania, New South Wales, and South Australia, and in Queensland where its distribution is limited to Lamington National Park.

Description

The caps of Mycena interrupta range from 0.8 to 2 cm, and they are a brilliant cyan blue colour. They are globose when emergent and then become a broad convex as they mature, with the centre of the cap slightly depressed. The caps are often sticky and appear slimy looking, particularly in moist weather.

The length of the stipe typically ranges from 1 to 2 cm long and 0.1 to 0.2 cm thick. It is white, smooth and the base of the stipe is attached to the wood substrate by a flat white disk, similar to Roridomyces austrororidus, which, unlike M. interrupta is attached to the wood substrate by a mass of clumped fine hairs.

The gills are white, adnexed, with blue margins. The spores are white, smooth, ellipsoid and have dimensions of 7–10×4–6 µm.

Unlike some other Mycena species, Mycena interrupta is not bioluminescent.

Habitat and distribution
The pixie's parasol appears in small colonies on rotting, moist wood in rainforests and beech or eucalypt forests. It has a Gondwanan distribution.

References

interrupta
Fungi described in 1860
Fungi of New Caledonia
Fungi of Oceania
Fungi of South America
Fungi of Chile
Fungi native to Australia
Taxa named by Miles Joseph Berkeley
Fungi without expected TNC conservation status